Julius Fučík is the name of:

People 
 Julius Fučík (journalist) (1903–1943), Czech journalist and leader in the forefront of the anti-Nazi resistance, the composer's nephew
 Julius Fučík (composer) (1872–1916), composer noted for patriotic Czech march music, the journalist's uncle

Other 
 MV Yulius Fuchik, a Soviet and later Russian barge carrier featured in the 1986 novel Red Storm Rising

See also
 Fučík